Chris Moise is a Canadian politician who was elected to represent Ward 13 Toronto Centre on Toronto City Council following the 2022 Toronto municipal election.

Political career 
He previously ran as an Ontario New Democratic Party candidate for Oak Ridges in the 1999 Ontario general election and for Brampton West—Mississauga in the 2003 Ontario general election, and as a federal New Democratic Party candidate for Brampton West in the 2004 Canadian federal election.

He ran for election to the Toronto District School Board in the 2014 Toronto municipal election, losing to incumbent trustee Sheila Ward; following Ward's death in office in 2016, he won the resulting by-election. In the 2018 Toronto municipal election, he initially registered to run for city council as a candidate in Ward 25; however, after the provincial government of Doug Ford passed legislation cutting the size of the city council in half by aligning ward boundaries with provincial and federal electoral district boundaries in the city, which would have pitted him against incumbent Ward 27 councillor Kristyn Wong-Tam in the new Ward 13, he withdrew from the race and ran for another term on the school board, winning re-election.

Moise is a Black Canadian, and openly gay.

References 

21st-century Canadian politicians
Toronto city councillors
Toronto District School Board trustees
Black Canadian politicians
Black Canadian LGBT people
LGBT municipal councillors in Canada
Gay politicians
Living people
Ontario New Democratic Party candidates in Ontario provincial elections
New Democratic Party candidates for the Canadian House of Commons
Candidates in the 2004 Canadian federal election
Year of birth missing (living people)
21st-century Canadian LGBT people
Canadian gay men